KFCM (98.3 FM) is a radio station broadcasting an oldies-leaning classic hits format. Licensed to Cherokee Village, Arkansas, United States. The station is currently owned by KFCM, Inc.

References

External links

FCM
Classic hits radio stations in the United States